Dacono is a home rule municipality located in southwestern Weld County, Colorado, United States. The city population was 6,297 at the 2020 United States Census, an increase of +51.66% since the 2010 United States Census. Dacono is a part of the Greeley, CO Metropolitan Statistical Area and the Front Range Urban Corridor.

History
The city name's is an amalgamation of the names of Daisy Baum, Cora Van Vorhies, and Nora Brooks. Dacono was first settled in 1901, and early settlers moved there to work in the coal mines. The city was incorporated in 1908.

Geography
Dacono is located at  (40.075772, -104.945353).

At the 2020 United States Census, the town had a total area of  including  of water.

Demographics

As of the census of 2000, there were 3,015 people, 1,087 households, and 756 families residing in the city. The racial makeup of the city was 77.05% White, 0.43% African American, 0.96% Native American, 1.00% Asian, 17.98% from other races, and 2.59% from two or more races. Hispanic or Latino people of any race were 32.04% of the population.

There were 1,087 households, out of which 34.6% had children under the age of 18 living with them, 55.3% were married couples living together, 9.3% had a female householder with no husband present, and 30.4% were non-families. 23.6% of all households were made up of individuals, and 7.6% had someone living alone who was 65 years of age or older.  The average household size was 2.77 and the average family size was 3.32.

In the city, the population was spread out, with 29.2% under the age of 18, 7.9% from 18 to 24, 32.4% from 25 to 44, 21.2% from 45 to 64, and 9.3% who were 65 years of age or older.  The median age was 33 years. For every 100 females, there were 100.2 males.  For every 100 females age 18 and over, there were 99.3 males.

The median income for a household in the city was $38,854, and the median income for a family was $42,659. Males had a median income of $29,899 versus $25,000 for females. The per capita income for the city was $15,368.  About 3.6% of families and 6.0% of the population were below the poverty line, including 6.5% of those under age 18 and 6.4% of those age 65 or over.

Points of interest
Dacono is home to the Colorado National Speedway.

See also

Colorado
Bibliography of Colorado
Index of Colorado-related articles
Outline of Colorado
List of counties in Colorado
List of municipalities in Colorado
List of places in Colorado
List of statistical areas in Colorado
Front Range Urban Corridor
North Central Colorado Urban Area
Denver-Aurora-Boulder, CO Combined Statistical Area
Greeley, CO Metropolitan Statistical Area

References

External links

City of Dacono website
CDOT map of the City of Dacono
Carbon Valley Edition of the Longmont Times-Call (local news, information & advertising)

Cities in Weld County, Colorado
Cities in Colorado